Elmer L. Román is a former Puerto Rican government official who served as the 26th Secretary of State of Puerto Rico from December 2019 till August 2020, which included the role of Lieutenant Governor, after being designated by Governor Wanda Vázquez Garced. He was previously appointed as the 2nd Secretary of the Puerto Rico Department of Public Safety on April 9, 2019, succeeding Héctor Pesquera. On August 20, 2020, Román resigned to the post of Secretary of State, allegedly to return to his former workplace, The Pentagon, where he worked as Director of the Joint Capability Technology Demonstration (JCTD) and team leader for Mission Integration in the Office of the Under Secretary of Defense for Research and Engineering.

Román was born in Yauco, Puerto Rico. He completed a bachelor's in mechanical engineering at University of Puerto Rico at Mayagüez and a master's in systems engineering at Virginia Tech. He completed executive development courses at the John F. Kennedy School of Government and is currently completing a doctor of administration at Colorado Technical University.

Military career
Román became a member of the Civil Air Patrol where he earned the General Carl A Spaatz Award, the highest award in the Civil Air Patrol cadet program. He went on to the Marine Corps Recruit Depot Parris Island to begin his military career in the United States Marine Corps Reserve. Went on as a Platoon Sergeant, 4th Light Armored Reconnaissance Battalion. Went on to graduate from the United States Marine Corps Officer Candidates School at Marine Corps Base Quantico. He transitioned to the United States Navy Reserve as an Engineering Duty Officer. Served as Director, Joint Capability Technology Demonstration and Commanding Officer, NR NAVSEA Supervisor of Salvage and Diving Unit. Other military positions he held include one with the Office of Naval Research as Regional Director, at the United States Embassy in Santiago, Chile. Among his military awards are the Meritorious Service Medal, Navy and Marine Corps Commendation Medal and the Navy and Marine Corps Achievement Medal He is currently a Captain in the US Navy Reserve.

References 

21st-century American naval officers
Living people
Members of the 17th Cabinet of Puerto Rico
People from Yauco, Puerto Rico
People of the Civil Air Patrol
Puerto Rican military officers
Puerto Rican United States Marines
Puerto Rican United States Navy personnel
Recipients of the Meritorious Service Medal (United States)
Secretaries of State of Puerto Rico
University of Puerto Rico at Mayagüez people
University of Puerto Rico alumni
United States Marines
United States Navy officers
United States Navy reservists
United States Marine Corps reservists
Virginia Tech alumni
Year of birth missing (living people)